Klötze is a town in the Altmarkkreis Salzwedel (district), in Saxony-Anhalt, Germany. It is situated approximately 20 km northwest of Gardelegen, and 35 km northeast of Wolfsburg.
It was mentioned first in 1144 with the name Cloetze, which means a wooden block. In January 2010, with the disbanding of the Verwaltungsgemeinschaft ("collective municipality") of Klötze, the town absorbed 11 former municipalities.

Geography 
The town Klötze consists of the following Ortschaften or municipal divisions:

Dönitz
Immekath
Jahrstedt
Klötze
Kunrau
Kusey
Neuendorf
Neuferchau
Ristedt
Schwiesau
Steimke
Trippigleben
Wenze

References

Towns in Saxony-Anhalt
 
Altmarkkreis Salzwedel